Plaveč is a village and municipality in Stará Ľubovňa District in the Prešov Region of northern Slovakia.

Etymology
Plavec (Polovtsian in Slovak) → Plaveč.

History
In historical records the village was first mentioned in 1287. The ruins of the 13th century Plaveč Castle lie above the town, after a fire in 1856.

Geography
The municipality lies at an altitude of 488 metres and covers an area of 16.683 km². It has a population of about 1857 people.

References

External links
http://www.statistics.sk/mosmis/eng/run.html

Villages and municipalities in Stará Ľubovňa District
Šariš